BBVA México is the largest Mexican financial institution (2021), having about 20% of the market. Founded in 1932 as Banco de Comercio (Bancomer), and rebranded from 2000 to 2019 as BBVA Bancomer, its main stockholder is the Spanish bank BBVA. Its headquarters are located at the Torre BBVA México on Paseo de la Reforma in Mexico City.

History
BBVA México, formerly Bancomer (Banco de Comercio), was founded in Mexico City in 1932 by Salvador Ugarte, Raul Bailleres, Liberto Senderos, Mario Dominguez, and Ernesto Amescua, with Ugarte holding about two-thirds of the shares, possibly for other investors. In 1982, Bancomer was nationalized when President José López Portillo nationalized the country’s banking system. In 1991, during the presidency of Carlos Salinas de Gortari, Bancomer was again privatized when a group of investors led by Eugenio Garza Lagüera bought the majority of the stock. In July 2000, Spanish Banco Bilbao Vizcaya Argentaria purchased most of Bancomer S.A.'s public stock from Canadian-based BMO Financial Group, partially merging it with BBV Probursa, thus the BBVA in its name. In February 2004, BBVA bought the remaining shares of Bancomer S.A.'s public stock to take complete ownership of the bank. 

BBVA México serves over 11 million customers, has 1,704 bank locations, and 4,286 ATMs. It currently operates as fully owned subsidiary of Spanish BBVA Group. It represents 40% of the total revenues of BBVA worldwide, making it the biggest bank of the group outside Spain. 

In June 2019, BBVA unified its brand worldwide and BBVA Bancomer was renamed BBVA.

References

External links

 Official site
 BBVA official site
  BBVA Bancomer US operations

Banks of Mexico
Banco Bilbao Vizcaya Argentaria
Banks established in 1932
Mexican companies established in 1932
Mexican subsidiaries of foreign companies